Harald Ossian Hjalmarson (14 July 1868 – 15 December 1919) was a Swedish soldier who volunteered for the Finnish Civil War in 1918 on the white army. He served as the commander of Hjalmarson's group, the Crenatorial Division, which belonged to the Western Army. At the Finnish White Headquarters, his actions during the war were dissatisfactory and he was not popular among the ranks. Hjalmarson received the rank of Major General in the Finnish Army, but in the Swedish Army as he was only a lieutenant colonel.

Biography

Career before the Finnish Civil War
Hjalmarson's father, Major Hjalmar Andersson, had volunteered for the American Civil War. He was also the grandson of the theater director Oscar Andersson. Hjalmarson began his military career by enlisting in the North Scanian Infantry Regiment in 1887. He graduated as an officer in 1889, attended the Royal Swedish Army Staff College from 1892 to 1894, was a candidate in the Swedish General Staff for some time in 1895, and then served as a lieutenant in his old regiment. In 1905 he was promoted to captain. However, he did not find positions in the Swedish Army that matched his ambition and therefore sought to join the French Army and spent a year in Russia. He was a locomotive driver on the Swedish State Railways for up to a year. From 1911 he was colonel and commander of the Persian Gendarmerie. In his memoirs he shares the attitude to war participation:

Finnish Civil War
In February 1918, Hjalmarson, along with some other Swedish officers, resigned from the Swedish army to volunteer for the Finnish White Forces, as the Swedish government did not want to send official Swedish troops to take part in the Finnish Civil War. About thirty Swedish active officers and fifty reserve officers went to Finland. Upon arriving in Vaasa, Hjalmarson was immediately recruited as a colonel in the Finnish White Army, and he was tasked with leading a 650-man special unit, which was to proceed through the red lines and go to help the embargoed Eastern Uusimaa protection municipalities. However, the attempt failed, as the Uusimaa whites had already dispersed and Hjalmarson's men were beaten back in the Battle of Heinola at the end of February.

On 6 March an army group known as the Hjalmarson Group was formed under Hjalmarson, one of the four white groups to participate in the siege and conquest of the city of Tampere . The group was to proceed from Virrat via Kuru to Orivesi and thus besiege the reds on the Battle of Vilppula. Due to the inexperience of his troops and the red counterattack, Hjalmarson was set off late on schedule. He won the Battle of Kuru on 15–17 March, but the siege of the Reds failed, as they withdrew from the front overnight and, unaware of the success of other army groups in Hjalmarson, did not embark on an effective pursuit. As a result, White Headquarters and General Mannerheim completely lost confidence in him. After the Battle of Kuru, Hjalmarson himself shot several Red Guards who had been taken prisoner, such as Matti Kuljun, a company manager from Tampere.

After the battle at Kuru, Hjalmarson's troops marched across the ice of Lake Näsijärvi from Teisko and went to help the Satakunta group commanded by Ernst Linder. They took part in the end of the Battle of Tampere by occupying Viljakkala on 23 March and biting into on 26 March in the west edge of Epilään, where they remained until the surrender of the city. After the battle of Tampere, Hjalmarson took command of the Lempäälä front and the Swedish Brigade, but the focus of the war had already shifted elsewhere. When the Reds seceded from the Lempäälä front on 25 April, Hjalmarson again chased late. He still led the Swedish Volunteer Brigade at the White Victory Parade in Helsinki on 16 May. Despite his wishes, Hjalmarson did not get a permanent post in the Finnish army, as the Swedes were ousted from the German path as early as June 1918. However, in connection with his resignation, he received the rank of Major General in the Finnish Armed Forces.

Later life
Hjalmarson returned to the Swedish Army in January 1919, where he had to settle for his old rank as lieutenant colonel. Hjalmarson was accused in the wake of the Finnish Civil War of both his inability as commander and the murder of prisoners of war in Kuru, so to clean up his reputation he wrote a memoir titled Mina krigsminnen från Finland: ur en svensk-frivilligs dagboksanteckningar från fälttåget 1918 in Finland. Hjalmarson had suffered from a chronic illness since his Persian years and had to use strong medication. He then committed suicide in Uppsala in December 1919.

Jarl Hjalmarson, a politician who chaired the Swedish right-wing party, was the son of Harald Hjalmarson.

Awards
 China: Order of the Golden Harvest, earliest 1915 and latest 1918
: Legion of Honour, Knight, 1908
 Iran: Order of the Lion and the Sun, Second Class, earliest 1910 and latest 1915
 Iran: Persian Officer of Public Instruction
: Order of the Sword, Knight of the First Class, 1910 
: Order of the Polar Star, Knight, 1914

References

Bibliography
 Harald Hjalmarson
 Uppsala universitetsbibliotek, 3 vol.

1868 births
1919 deaths
Swedish Army officers
People of the Finnish Civil War (White side)
Military personnel from Stockholm
Swedish expatriates in Finland
Swedish expatriates in Iran
People of Qajar Iran
1919 suicides